Lourdes is a town in southern France. Lourdes may also refer to:

Places

 Sanctuary of Our Lady of Lourdes, often referred to simply as "Lourdes", a site of religious pilgrimage in the town of Lourdes in France, reputed to heal the sick
 Our Lady of Lourdes
 Lourdes apparitions
 Lourdes water
 Lourdes, São Paulo, Brazil
 Lourdes, Norte de Santander, Colombia
 Lourdes, Newfoundland and Labrador, Canada
 Lourdes, Paraguay
 Notre-Dame-de-Lourdes, Manitoba, Canada
 Nossa Senhora de Lourdes, Sergipe, Brazil

Other uses

 Lourdes (given name)
 Lourdes, the title of an 1894 novel by the French writer Émile Zola
 Lourdes, the title of a 1914 book by Robert Hugh Benson
 Lourdes (2009 film), a film directed by Jessica Hausner
 Lourdes (2019 film), a documentary
 Lourdes SIGINT Station, Cuba
 Lourdes Stadium, a stadium in Drogheda, Republic of Ireland
 Russian Red (Lourdes Hernández or Lourdes), Spanish singer-songwriter
 Rochester Lourdes High School, in Rochester, Minnesota
 Lourdes High School (Oshkosh, Wisconsin) in Oshkosh, Wisconsin
 Lourdes University in Sylvania, Ohio

See also 

 Lourde (disambiguation)
 "Lou-erds", the Leeward Islands adjacent the Caribbean